The BMW Z9 (or Z9 Gran Turismo, Z9 GT) is a four-seat coupe concept car, carbon-fiber skin over an aluminum space frame. It was introduced on September in 1999 at the Frankfurt Auto Show. During the 2000 Paris Auto Show a convertible variant of the Z9 was debuted. It was designed by Adrian van Hooydonk under manage of Chris Bangle, who was promoted to Director of BMW Group Design. Much of the styling found on E63 6 series is derived from the Z9.

Interior design
A large, 8.8-inch monitor in the center of the dashboard displays all the information the driver needs, apart from the speedometer and tachometer, which are conventional analog instruments. The monitor is positioned within the driver's field of vision, allowing it to be viewed while focusing attention on the road ahead. Controls are operated with a single large, multifunction knob located between the front seats. The control (called the Intuitive Interaction Concept) consists of a combination rotary and push button for selecting functions. Confirmation of the selected mode is displayed on the dash mounted screen. Several hundred functions can be controlled with this device. The concept of operating the Z9, which BMW calls Intuitive Interaction Concept, allows the driver to easily activate functions while driving without the need to constantly examine and manipulate conventional controls. It was an early prototype of the series production iDrive, introduced in 2001 on the BMW 7 Series (E65).

The Z9 has only a starter button and light switch on the dashboard. An electronic key is used to activate the driver's controls. Then, a simple starter button starts the engine. The instrument panel folds out when started. Classical music then plays and a circular dial emerges to provides feedback to the driver.

Drive or reverse gears can be engaged with a dash mounted lever.

The Steptronic transmission can also be operated with steering wheel mounted buttons. These buttons can be used for manually shifting gears. The Z9 featured the V8 turbo-diesel from the BMW 7 Series (E38) 740d model.

Exterior design
The Z9 Gran Turismo Concept car features the long hood and short rear deck that have become hallmarks of BMW sport coupe design. The “face” of the Z9 incorporated trademark BMW design elements, such as the dual round headlights flanking the central kidney grille. Large wheels, 20-inch front and 21 inch rear, provided a hint of the performance capability of the Z9. Front and rear turn signals featured neon light technology, while rear lights incorporated light-emitting diodes (LED).

One of the most striking features of the Z9 is the gull wing door, though unusually conventional doors are also fitted into the gull wings, allowing the doors to function in both ways. The full-length gull wing doors can be opened automatically at the press of a button on the electronic key. Depressing the button on the remote control will both open and close a door.

The Z9 did not make it into production, but many of its innovations did.

Engine
The Z9 featured a V8 turbo diesel BMW M67, from the BMW 7 Series (E38) 740d model. The 3.9 liter V-8 is a common rail, direct injection unit. Maximum power was at the time an impressive 245 hp and it produced 413 lb ft torque (560 Nm). Torque is maintained constantly between 1750 and 2500 rpm to give high performance even at the low end of the rev range. Choosing a diesel engine to power a large sports coupe like the Z9 is a testament to BMW's confidence in the refinement and performance characteristics of the 3.9 liter V-8.

References

Z9